Sedimentary Geology is a peer-reviewed scientific journal about sediments in a geological context published by Elsevier. About its scope the journal states it ranges "from techniques of sediment analysis to geodynamical aspects of sedimentary-basin evolution.".

External links 
 

Geology journals
English-language journals
Sedimentology
Sedimentary rocks
Sedimentary basins